František Douda (23 October 1908 – 15 January 1990) was a Czech shot putter who competed for Czechoslovakia. He was born in Planá nad Lužnicí.

He won an Olympic bronze medal at the 1932 Summer Olympics. In the same year he also set a world record with 16.20 metres on 24 September 1932 in Prague. The record stood until 21 April 1934, when American John Lyman improved it to 16.48 metres.

International competitions

References

1908 births
1990 deaths
People from Tábor District
20th-century Czech people
Czechoslovak male discus throwers
Czech male discus throwers
Czech male shot putters
Czechoslovak male shot putters
Olympic athletes of Czechoslovakia
Olympic bronze medalists for Czechoslovakia
Athletes (track and field) at the 1928 Summer Olympics
Athletes (track and field) at the 1932 Summer Olympics
Athletes (track and field) at the 1936 Summer Olympics
World record setters in athletics (track and field)
European Athletics Championships medalists
Olympic bronze medalists in athletics (track and field)
Medalists at the 1932 Summer Olympics
Sportspeople from the South Bohemian Region